John Henning (May 22, 1937 – July 7, 2010) was an American news reporter and political analyst who spent many years on Boston television before becoming a commentator on radio.

Biography

Early life and education
Born in New York City, the son of Mary and Walter Henning (his father spent 36 years as a New York City police detective), he was the oldest of six children. His younger brother is veteran college football and NFL coach Dan Henning. Henning graduated from St. Peter's College in Jersey City, New Jersey, and came to Boston in 1959 to get a Master's Degree at Boston University.

Career

While studying, he interned at WGBH-TV (channel 2), where among his duties, he covered sports. But his heart was in news and politics. After two years at WGBH, he spent eight months in the Army. In 1964, he was hired at what was then known as WNAC-TV (now WHDH-TV) as a street reporter. He also began covering local and national elections, something he would become known for. By 1965, WNAC promoted him to news anchor, and he did the 6pm and 11pm newscasts.  It was during this time that he began to gain the reputation as a dependable, accurate and savvy reporter who knows how to separate spin from fact. Henning left WNAC-TV in 1968, going to work for the old WHDH-TV (now WCVB-TV), Channel 5.

Henning remained at Channel 5 till April 1977, when he returned to the anchor desk at Channel 7.  While his reporting continued to win him praise, the ratings at WNAC-TV did not go up, and he was taken off the anchor desk and reassigned to other duties. Not long after that, in late June 1981, he decided to resign. At that time, media critic Robert MacLean of the Boston Globe wrote that "It is acknowledged among his colleagues that Henning, a veteran Boston TV newsman, [is] perhaps one of the best street reporters in the history of Boston TV news..."

Due to a non-compete clause in his contract, he remained off the air till January 1982, at which time he was hired by WBZ-TV (Channel 4) to anchor the noon news. Henning spent the rest of his career working for WBZ, winning a number of awards in the process. In 1994, he was able to report on the success of his brother Dan Henning, who was named the football coach at Boston College.

Meanwhile, after many years of anchoring, John stepped down from anchoring the noon news in May 1995, and WBZ-TV made him their senior correspondent, with a specialty in local and national politics.  The veteran reporter also covered the State House. Henning retired from full-time reporting in 2003, but continued to do commentary for WBZ-TV and WBZ Radio, where he teamed up with another political commentator, Jon Keller, to do a feature called "Eye on Politics."

Death
Henning was diagnosed with myelodysplastic syndrome, a condition in which the bone marrow does not produce enough blood cells, in November 2009. He underwent a bone marrow transplant, but it was unsuccessful. Henning died on July 7, 2010 at Massachusetts General Hospital from leukemia complications at the age of 73.

Awards
1999: Dennis Kauff Memorial Lifetime Achievement Award
2003: George Heller Memorial Gold Card, American Federation of Television and Radio Artists

References

Bibliography
Claffey, Charles E. "Henning Knows the People, the City in Which He Works." Boston Globe, July 21, 1981.
Powers, Dick.  "Channel 4 Revamps Early Morning News Format."  Boston Globe, December 17, 1981.

1937 births
2010 deaths
Deaths from myelodysplastic syndrome
American male journalists
Television anchors from Boston
Boston University College of Communication alumni
Deaths from cancer in Massachusetts
Deaths from leukemia
Saint Peter's University alumni
Journalists from New York City